Bahrain competed at the 1992 Summer Olympics in Barcelona, Spain. Ten competitors, all men, took part in ten events in two sports.

Competitors
The following is the list of number of competitors in the Games.

Athletics

Men's 100 metres
Khalid Juma Juma 
 Heat — 10.80 (→ did not advance)

Men's 5000 metres
Abdullah Al-Dosari
 Heat — 14:23.07 (→ did not advance)

Men's 10,000 metres
Abdullah Al-Dosari
 Heat — did not finish (→ no ranking)

Men's marathon
 Ali Saad Mubarak — 2:39.19 (→ 79th place)

Men's 110 m hurdles
 Khalid Abdulla Abdan 
 Heats — 15.41 (→ did not advance)

Men's javelin throw
Ahmed Nesaif 
 Qualification — 55.24 m  (→ did not advance)

Men's hammer throw
Rashid Alameeri 
 Qualification — 56.08 m (→ did not advance)

Cycling

Four cyclists represented Bahrain in 1992.

Men's road race
 Saber Mohamed Hasan
 Jameel Kadhem
 Jamal Ahmed Al-Doseri

Men's team time trial
 Mamdooh Al-Doseri
 Saber Mohamed Hasan
 Jameel Kadhem
 Jamal Ahmed Al-Doseri

References

External links
Official Olympic Reports

Nations at the 1992 Summer Olympics
1992
Summer Olympics